The following is a list of the longest caves in the United States per length of documented passageways. Many passageways are still being discovered; this list is based on the latest verifiable data.

See also
List of caves
List of longest caves
List of deepest caves

References

Longest
Caves